Spanoudakis is a surname. Notable people with the surname include: 

Alekos Spanoudakis (1928–2019), Greek basketball player
Ioannis Spanoudakis (1930–2010), Greek basketball player and coach
Stamatis Spanoudakis (born 1948), Greek composer

Greek-language surnames